Hank Jones was an American jazz pianist who recorded from 1947 to 2010.

As leader/co-leader

Great Jazz Trio

Great Jazz Quartet/Quintet

As sideman 

With Pepper Adams
 The Cool Sound of Pepper Adams (Regent, 1958) – recorded in 1957
 Pepper Adams Plays the Compositions of Charlie Mingus (Workshop Jazz, 1964) – recorded in 1963
 Conjuration: Fat Tuesday's Session (Reservoir, 1990) – recorded in 1983

With Gene Ammons
 Bad! Bossa Nova (Prestige, 1962)
 Got My Own (Prestige, 1972)
 Big Bad Jug (Prestige, 1973) – recorded in 1972

With Eddie Bert
 Musician of the Year (Savoy, 1955)
 Encore (Savoy, 1955)
 Montage (Savoy, 1955)

With Bob Brookmeyer
 Tonite's Music Today (Storyville, 1956) with Zoot Sims
 Whooeeee (Storyville, 1956) - Zoot Sims-Bob Brookmeyer Quintet
 Brookmeyer (Vik, 1956)
 Stretching Out (United Artists, 1958) - Zoot Sims-Bob Brookmeyer Octet
 Jazz Is a Kick (Mercury, 1960)
 Gloomy Sunday and Other Bright Moments (Verve, 1961)

With Ruth Brown 
 Late Date with Ruth Brown (Atlantic, 1959)
 Ruth Brown '65 (Mainstream, 1965)

With Kenny Burrell
 Night Song (Verve, 1969)
 Bluesin' Around (Columbia, 1983) – recorded in 1962

With Donald Byrd
 Byrd's Word (Savoy, 1955)
 New Formulas from the Jazz Lab (RCA Victor, 1957) with Gigi Gryce
 Jazz Lab (Jubilee, 1958) with Gigi Gryce

With Jimmy Cleveland 
 Introducing Jimmy Cleveland and His All Stars (EmArcy, 1955)
 Rhythm Crazy (EmArcy, 1964) – recorded in 1959

With Al Cohn
 That Old Feeling (RCA Victor, 1955)
 The Brothers! (RCA Victor, 1955) with Bill Perkins and Richie Kamuca
 From A to...Z (RCA Victor, 1956) with Zoot Sims
 The Sax Section (Epic, 1956)
 Cohn on the Saxophone (Dawn, 1956)
 Son of Drum Suite (RCA Victor, 1960)

With Art Farmer
 Last Night When We Were Young (ABC-Paramount, 1957)
 Portrait of Art Farmer (Contemporary, 1958)
 The Aztec Suite (United Artists, 1959)

With Curtis Fuller
 New Trombone (Prestige, 1957)
 Cabin in the Sky (Impulse!, 1962)

With Dizzy Gillespie
 A Portrait of Duke Ellington (Verve, 1960)
 The Bop Session (Sonet, 1975) – with Sonny Stitt, Percy Heath and Max Roach

With Dexter Gordon
 Ca'Purange (Prestige, 1972)
 Tangerine  (Prestige, 1972)

With Johnny Hartman
 I Just Dropped by to Say Hello (Impulse!, 1963)
 The Voice That Is! (Impulse!, 1964)

With Coleman Hawkins
 The Hawk in Hi Fi (RCA Victor, 1956)
 The Hawk in Paris (Vik, 1956)
 Coleman Hawkins and Confrères (Verve, 1958)
 The High and Mighty Hawk (Felsted, 1958)

With Johnny Hodges
 Sandy's Gone (Verve, 1963)
 Wings & Things (Verve, 1965) with Wild Bill Davis
 Blue Notes (Verve, 1966)
 Triple Play (RCA Victor, 1967)
 Don't Sleep in the Subway (Verve, 1967)
 3 Shades of Blue (Flying Dutchman, 1970)

With Milt Jackson
 Opus de Jazz (Savoy, 1956)
 The Jazz Skyline (Savoy, 1956)
 Bags & Flutes (Atlantic, 1957)
 Bags & Trane (Atlantic, 1960) with John Coltrane
 Statements (Impulse!, 1962)
 Big Bags (Riverside, 1962)
 For Someone I Love (Riverside, 1963)
 Milt Jackson Quintet Live at the Village Gate (Riverside, 1963)
 Much in Common (Verve, 1964) with Ray Brown
 Ray Brown / Milt Jackson (Verve, 1965) with Ray Brown

With J. J. Johnson
 J Is for Jazz (Columbia, 1956)
 Jay and Kai (Columbia, 1957)
 J.J.'s Broadway (Verve, 1963)
 J.J.! (RCA Victor, 1964)
 Broadway Express (RCA Victor, 1965)
 The Total J.J. Johnson (RCA Victor, 1967)

With Elvin Jones
 Elvin! (Riverside, 1962) – recorded in 1961-62
 And Then Again (Atlantic, 1965)
 Dear John C. (Impulse!, 1965)

With Joe Lovano
 I'm All For You (Blue Note, 2004)
 Joyous Encounter (Blue Note, 2005)
 Classic! Live at Newport (Blue Note, 2016) – recorded in 2005

With Oliver Nelson
 Oliver Nelson Plays Michelle (Impulse!, 1966)
 The Spirit of '67 with Pee Wee Russell (Impulse!, 1967)
 The Kennedy Dream (Impulse!, 1967)
 Encyclopedia of Jazz (Verve, 1967) – recorded in 1966
 The Sound of Feeling (Verve, 1968) – recorded in 1966-67

With Joe Newman
 Salute to Satch (RCA Victor, 1956)
 The Midgets (Vik, 1956)
 Hangin' Out with Joe Wilder (Concord Jazz, 1984)

With Art Pepper
 New York Album (Galaxy, 1985) – recorded in 1979
 So in Love (Artists House, 1979)

With Jimmy Raney 
 Jimmy Raney featuring Bob Brookmeyer with Bob Brookmeyer (ABC/Paramount, 1956)
 Here's That Raney Day (Ahead, 1980)

With Emily Remler 
 Firefly (Concord Records, 1981)
 East To Wes (Concord Records, 1988)

With Sahib Shihab
 The Jazz We Heard Last Summer (Savoy, 1957)
 Jazz Sahib (Savoy, 1957)

With Johnny Smith
 Johnny Smith (Verve, 1967)
 Johnny Smith's Kaleidoscope (Verve, 1967)

With Bob Stewart
 Welcome to the Club (VWC, 1986)
 Talk of The Town (VWC, 2004)

With Sonny Stitt
 Sonny Stitt Plays Arrangements from the Pen of Quincy Jones (Roost, 1955)
 Sonny Stitt Plays (Roost, 1955)
 Sonny Stitt with the New Yorkers (Roost, 1957)
 Stitt in Orbit (Roost, 1962)
  Now! (Impulse!, 1963)
  Salt and Pepper (Impulse!, 1963)
 Goin' Down Slow (Prestige, 1972)

With Lucky Thompson
 Lucky Thompson Plays Jerome Kern and No More (Moodsville, 1963)
 Lucky Strikes (Prestige, 1964)

With Cal Tjader
 Warm Wave (Verve, 1964)
 Breathe Easy (Galaxy, 1977)

With Ben Webster
 Music for Loving (Norgran, 1954)
 Wanted to Do One Together with "Sweets" Edison (Columbia, 1962)
 See You at the Fair (Impulse!, 1964)

With Ernie Wilkins
 Flutes & Reeds (Savoy, 1955) with Frank Wess
 Top Brass (Savoy, 1955)

With Joe Wilder
 Wilder 'n' Wilder (Savoy, 1956)
 The Pretty Sound (Columbia, 1959)

With Kai Winding
 The Swingin' States (Columbia, 1958)
 Dance to the City Beat (Columbia, 1959) – recorded in 1958-59
 More Brass (Verve, 1966)

With others
 Cannonball Adderley, Somethin' Else (Blue Note, 1958)
 Manny Albam, The Soul of the City (Solid State, 1966)
 Harry Allen, Isn't This a Lovely Day (BMG, 2004)
 Elek Bacsik, I Love You (Bob Thiele Music, 1974)
 Chet Baker, Baker's Holiday (Limelight, 1965)
 Louie Bellson, Drummer's Holiday (Verve, 1958) – recorded in 1956-58
 Anthony Braxton, Seven Standards (Magenta, 1985)
 Rusty Bryant, For the Good Times (Prestige, 1973)
 Benny Carter, Legends (MusicMasters, 1993)
 Ron Carter, 1 + 3 (JVC, 1978)
 Paul Chambers, Bass on Top (Blue Note, 1957)
 Kenny Clarke and Ernie Wilkins, Kenny Clarke & Ernie Wilkins (Savoy, 1955)
 Earl Coleman, Earl Coleman Returns (Prestige, 1956)
 Eddie Diehl, Well, Here It Is... (Lineage, 2004) – recorded in 2003
 Kenny Dorham, Jazz Contrasts (Riverside, 1957)
 Victor Feldman, Merry Olde Soul (Riverside, 1961)
 Ella Fitzgerald, Rhythm Is My Business (Verve, 1962)
 Johnny Griffin, Soul Groove (Atlantic, 1963) with Matthew Gee
 Gigi Gryce, Gigi Gryce (MetroJazz, 1958)
 Lionel Hampton, You Better Know It!!! (Impulse!, 1965)
 Donna Hightower, Take One (Capitol, 1959)
 Shirley Horn, Loads of Love (Mercury, 1963) – recorded in 1962
 Bobbi Humphrey, Flute In (Blue Note, 1971)
 Illinois Jacquet, Groovin' with Jacquet (Clef, 1956) – recorded in 1951-53
 Budd Johnson, French Cookin' (Argo, 1963)
 Jo Jones, Our Man, Papa Jo! (Denon, 1978) – recorded in 1977
 Quincy Jones, The Deadly Affair (Original Soundtrack) (Verve, 1967) – recorded in 1966
 Clifford Jordan, Hello, Hank Jones (Eastworld, 1978)
 Irene Kral, SteveIreneo! (United Artists, 1959)
 Gene Krupa and Buddy Rich, The Drum Battle (Verve, 1960) – recorded in 1952
 Keiko Lee, Live At "Basie" (Sony, 2006)
 Mel Lewis,  Mel Lewis and Friends (A&M/Horizon, 1977) – recorded in 1976
 Herbie Mann, Salute to the Flute (Epic, 1957)
 Shelly Manne, 2-3-4 (Impulse!, 1962)
 Warne Marsh, Star Highs (Criss Cross Jazz, 1982)
 Mat Mathews, Eddie Costa, Mat Mathews & Don Elliott at Newport (Verve, 1957)
 Gary McFarland, The Jazz Version of "How to Succeed in Business without Really Trying" (Verve, 1962) – recorded in 1961
 Howard McGhee, Howard McGhee and Milt Jackson (Savoy, 1955) – recorded in 1948
 Jackie McLean, New Wine in Old Bottles (East Wind, 1978)
 Helen Merrill, Helen Merrill with Strings (EmArcy, 1955)
 Wes Montgomery, SO Much Guitar! (Riverside, 1961)
 James Moody, Great Day (Argo, 1963)
 Frank Morgan, You Must Believe in Spring (Antilles, 1992)
 Anita O'Day, All the Sad Young Men (Verve, 1962)
 Specs Powell, Movin' In (Roulette, 1957)
 Buddy Rich and Mel Tormé, Together Again: For the First Time (Gryphon Records, 1978); reissued as When I Found You (Hindsight Records, 1999) – recorded in 1978
 Jerome Richardson, Midnight Oil (New Jazz, 1959)
 Nelson Riddle, Phil Silvers and Swinging Brass (Columbia, 1957)
 Charlie Rouse and Paul Quinichette, The Chase Is On (Bethlehem, 1958)
 Jimmy Rushing, Every Day I Have the Blues (BluesWay, 1967)
 A. K. Salim, Flute Suite (Savoy, 1957) with Frank Wess and Herbie Mann
 Rex Stewart and Cootie Williams, The Big Challenge (Jazztone, 1957)
 Ira Sullivan, The Incredible Ira Sullivan (Stash, 1980)
 Clark Terry and Bob Brookmeyer, Gingerbread Men (Mainstream, 1966)
 Ben Webster, Music with Feeling (Norgran, 1955)
 Frank Wess, Opus de Blues (Savoy, 1984) – recorded in 1959
 Nancy Wilson, But Beautiful (Capitol, 1971) – recorded in 1969
 Cootie Williams, Cootie Williams in Hi-Fi (RCA Victor, 1958)
 Lem Winchester, Another Opus (New Jazz, 1960)
 Lester Young,  Laughin' to Keep from Cryin' (Verve, 1958)

References

Jazz discographies
Discographies of American artists